"Twenty Two" is a song by the Swedish punk rock band Millencolin from the album For Monkeys. It was released as a single on 6 April 1997 by Shock Records, including two B-sides from the album's recording sessions, "Israelites" and "Vixen". These two tracks were re-released in 1999 on the compilation album The Melancholy Collection. "Twenty Two" was released only in Australia, in place of "Lozin' Must" which was released as the album's single in Europe and the United States, because "Lozin' Must" contained profanity.

Track listing
"Twenty Two"
"Israelites" (originally performed by Desmond Dekker)
"Vixen"

Personnel

Millencolin
Nikola Sarcevic - lead vocals, bass
Erik Ohlsson - guitar
Mathias Färm - guitar
Fredrik Larzon - drums

References

Millencolin songs
1997 singles
1997 songs
Song articles with missing songwriters